Ellen Marie Corbett is an American Democratic politician from the San Francisco Bay Area. She served in the California State Senate, representing the 10th District, which included San Leandro, Hayward, Pleasanton, Union City, Fremont, Newark, Milpitas, and part of San Jose. She was the Senate Majority Leader.

Ellen Corbett was elected to the California State Assembly in the 1998, and served there until 2004, when she was termed out. She servedon the San Leandro City Council and was the first woman in the city's history directly elected as Mayor.  Corbett served as Mayor of San Leandro from 1994 to 1998.  Corbett  has worked as an attorney, community college professor and civic activist. In 2016, Corbett was elected as a board member of the East Bay Regional Park District.

Corbett attended Chabot Community College and California State University, East Bay. She graduated from the University of California, Davis and McGeorge Law School.

Corbett lives in San Leandro, California.

Senate 10th District
The 10th District encompasses the southern part of the East Bay, located directly south of California's 9th State Senate district. As such, it includes the southern half of Alameda County and a portion of Santa Clara County.

2011 redistricting
After redistricting in 2011 by the California Citizens Redistricting Commission, the new 10th district now includes 40.7% of Alameda County and 17.4% of Santa Clara County. Cities in the district include Fremont, Hayward, Milpitas, and Santa Clara. The new boundaries will take effect in the 2014 election for the district, which Corbett is ineligible to run in due to term limits.

2014 US Congressional elections

Corbett termed out of the state senate seat in 2014. In February 2013, addressing the possibility of her running for Eric Swalwell's seat in the US House of Representatives 15th congressional district, Corbett said "I would be honored to serve in [the United States] Congress, but it’s too early to discuss 2014."

After the 2013 legislative session, Corbett began campaigning against Swalwell, with the support of Pete Stark, who Swalwell defeated in 2012. However, she finished in third by 0.5% to Hugh Bussell, a technology manager/educator from Livermore, also in the race. Swalwell finished in the lead with almost 50 percent of the vote.

Legislative positions
Corbett has passed legislation to provide students with more information on student loan options, provide safeguards for car purchasers, and protect California homeowners who suffered during the nationwide housing crisis.

She has received an 87% rating from Clean Water Action California in 2012, and a 99% lifetime rating from the California League of Conservation Voters.

Corbett has publicly advocated for restoring of full funding to the Supplemental Nutrition Assistance Program in the 2012 U.S. Farm Bill, which had proposed cuts to the program.

Legislative honors
In 2008, Corbett was named one of the Top 100 Attorneys in California and an Outstanding Legislator by the California State Sheriff’s Association. She has received honors from the California Labor Federation, the Consumer Federation of California, the American Cancer Society, the California Congress of Seniors, the Sierra Club of California, the Environmental Working Group, the California League of Conservation Voters, Clean Water Action California, and the Hindu American Foundation.

References

External links
 
 Corbett at the Maplight.org campaign finance website
 Corbett at the Votesmart.org website
 Join California Ellen Corbett

American women lawyers
Women mayors of places in California
Lawyers from Oakland, California
Democratic Party California state senators
California State University, East Bay alumni
Educators from California
Living people
Mayors of places in California
People from San Leandro, California
McGeorge School of Law alumni
Democratic Party members of the California State Assembly
Politicians from Oakland, California
University of California, Davis alumni
Women state legislators in California
People from Hayward, California
San Francisco Bay Area politicians
21st-century American politicians
21st-century American women politicians
Chabot College faculty
American women academics
Year of birth missing (living people)